Kochki is a rural locality (a selo) and the administrative center of Kochkinsky Selsoviet of Rodinsky District, Altai Krai, Russia. The population was 885 in 2016. There are 12 streets.

Geography 
Kochki is located 37 km southeast of Rodino (the district's administrative centre) by road. Zelyonaya Dubrava is the nearest rural locality.

References 

Rural localities in Rodinsky District